Brihan Maharashtra College of Commerce, Pune is a college affiliated to Savitribai Phule Pune University (formerly Pune University) in the city of Pune, Maharashtra. The college was established in 1943, in Pune by the Deccan Education Society.

About
The college has two sections; The Junior Wing of the college is for students graduating from school and it offers course in commerce stream for them, at the end of which students may appear for the Higher-Secondary State Certificate examination. The Senior Wing offers bachelor's degrees, Master's degrees in commerce, business and computer applications. The college also offers doctoral and autonomous programs. BMCC offers Masters in Business Administration (MBA) course from the Yashwantrao Chavan Maharashtra Open University.

D. G. Karve, an economist and some time Deputy Governor of the Reserve Bank of India was the First Principal of the college. BMCC has recentlyearned the award of 'College with potential for excellence' from UGC.
Dr. S. U. Purohit is the principal of Brihan Maharashtra College of Commerce.

History
D G Karve, the first principal of the college, stated the mission of the college as "To make a citizen of India as fully endowed materially, intellectually and morally as the citizens of the most advanced country of the world is our collective aim." It started as the College of Commerce in the Amphi theatre of the Fergusson College on 20 June 1943. Sir Ardeshir Dalal formally inaugurated the college on 24 June 1943. Chandrashekhar Agashe, managing agent of Brihan Maharashtra Sugar Syndicate donated Rs 2 lakhs to the college, which was renamed as the Brihan Maharashtra College of Commerce. The naming ceremony was performed by Sir  Chintamanrao Deshmukh, the then Governor of the Reserve Bank of India, on 11 November 1944.

Till 1949, BMCC was affiliated with the Bombay University, which had a larger province under its jurisdiction. At that time also, BMCC was recognised as one of the best colleges. After 1949, it became affiliated with University of Pune.

Golden Jubilee
BMCC celebrated its fiftieth anniversary in 1993–94, when an academic project named CGA – BMTRC (Chandrashekhar Govind Agashe Business Motivation, Training and Research Centre) was undertaken. The CGA BMTRC Building, the Nav Maharashtra Hall and the Computer Laboratory were inaugurated on 2 August 1998.

Diamond Jubilee
In 2005, the Diamond Jubilee was celebrated by the college with Prime Minister and economist Manmohan Singh as the chief guest. The 'Prin. D. G. Karve Chair in Commerce & Economics', an academic activity for research and development, was launched at this occasion.

Awards and Rankings
In 2009, Brihan Maharashtra College of Commerce was awarded an 'A' grade by the National Assessment and Accreditation Council (NAAC). BMCC has been selected by the University Grants Commission (UGC) and awarded the status of 'College with Potential for Excellence' (CPE). In 2005, BMCC was ranked third in top ten commerce colleges surveyed by India Today magazine.

The college has been recognized with several awards and prizes in the recent past. It won the First Prize from the Yashwantrao Chavan Pratishthan, Mumbai for Annual Magazine 'Artha Vyavahar – 2001'. It received the 'Best College Award' of the University of Pune in February, 2002 under the Quality Improvement Programme. The college also received the 'Best NSS Unit Award' of the University of Pune in February, 2004. Several teachers and administrative staff members of the college have also been felicitated by the University, Pune Municipal Corporation and many other social bodies for their outstanding contribution. Recently, the annual magazine 'Artha Vyavahar' has been recognized by the University with Best Magazine Award. BMCC has become Pune's first autonomous college of commerce.

Alumni
Alok Rajwade – Actor
Amey Wagh – Actor
Ashutosh Agashe – MD, Brihan Maharashtra Sugar Syndicate
Cyrus Poonawalla-  Chairman, Poonawalla Group
Dnyaneshwar Agashe – Cricketer
Girish Bapat – Politician
Madan Deodhar – Actor 
Mohan Joshi – Actor
Nipun Dharmadhikari – Actor, Writer and Director
Prasad Oak –  Actor, director, writer, singer, anchor, poet and film producer
Ram Naik – Politician
Ravi Pandit – Co-founder & CEO, KPIT Technologies
Sayali Gokhale – Badminton Player
Sharad Pawar – Politician
Sheetal Agashe – Businesswoman
Sulajja Firodia Motwani – Vice Chairperson, Kinetic Engineering Limited
Siddharth Menon – Actor
Umesh Vinayak Kulkarni – Writer, Director
Rachana Ranade – Chartered Accountant, Finance & Stock Market Guru
Sarang Sathaye – Actor
Nipun Dharmadhikari – Director
Sachin Kundalkar – Director
Namita Thapar – Entrepreneur

References

External links
 Official website

Universities and colleges in Pune
Universities and colleges in Maharashtra
Commerce colleges in India
Deccan Education Society
1943 establishments in British India
Educational institutions established in 1943
Colleges affiliated to Savitribai Phule Pune University